The Ibn Rushd-Goethe Mosque is the only self-described liberal mosque in Germany. It was inaugurated in June 2017, and is named after medieval Andalusian-Arabic polymath Ibn Rushd and German writer and statesman Johann Wolfgang von Goethe. The mosque was founded by Seyran Ateş, a German lawyer and Muslim feminist of Kurdish descent.  The mosque is characterised as liberal; it bans face-covering, it allows women and men to pray together, and it accepts LGBT worshippers.

Background 
The mosque is open to Sunni, Shia and other Muslims. Full-face veils as Burqas or Niqabs are not allowed. Men and women pray together in the mosque and women are not obligated to wear a headscarf. Furthermore, gay and lesbian Muslims are allowed to enter the mosque and can pray as well. It is the first mosque of its kind in Germany and one of the first in Europe as well as the entire world.

Founder Seyran Ateş said "We need a historical-critical exegesis of the Quran" and "A scripture from the 7th century one may not and cannot take literally. We stand for a reading of the Quran which is oriented to mercifulness, love of God and most of all to peace". The mosque is a "place for all those people who do not meet the rules and regulations of conservative Muslims".

History 

The mosque was founded by Seyran Ateş, a German lawyer and feminist of Turkish and Kurdish descent, on 16 June 2017. It was named after the Andalusian-Arabic polymath Ibn Rushd (also known as Averroes) and the German writer and statesman Goethe.

Ateş told news magazine Der Spiegel that “no one will be let in with a niqab or burqa veil. This is for security reasons and also it is our belief that full-face veils have nothing to do with religion, but rather are a political statement.” She told the journalists that she was inspired by Wolfgang Schäuble, the German Minister of Finance, who told her that liberal Muslims should band together.

In July 2022, the mosque became the first in Germany to raise a rainbow flag, in support of the LGBT community.

Reactions 
Following massive threats after the opening, the founders of the mosque commented on the immense intimidation that liberal Muslims faced. They asked for tolerance and respect with regard to their reading of the Quran. The personal security for founder Ateş had to be increased significantly after evaluation by the State Criminal Police Office of Berlin. In July 2017, Ateş, reported that she had received about 100 death threats since the mosque's opening.

Turkish mass media displayed the Rushd-Goethe mosque as part of the Gülen movement, a claim denied by Ercan Karakoyun, chairman of the Gülen-affiliated foundation in Germany Stiftung Dialog und Bildung. The claim has also been denied by the mosque itself. Turkish media have been critical, and Ateş has been at the receiving end of threats and hostility, both from radical and enemies and critics of Islam, both in Germany and abroad.

The fatwa institution in Egypt, the Egyptian Fatwa Council at the Al-Azhar University, labelled the mosque an attack on Islam, and a fatwa against the mosque was declared. The Turkish religious authority and the Egyptian authority condemned her project and she has received death threats. The fatwa encompassed all present and future liberal mosques. The Al-Azhar University is opposed to liberal reform of Islam and issued the fatwa because of the mosque's ban on face-covering veils such as burqa and niqab on its premises, allowing women and men to pray together and accepting homosexuals.

References

Further reading

Mosques in Berlin
Mosques completed in 2017
2017 establishments in Germany
Liberal and progressive movements within Islam
LGBT and Islam
Islam and women